Van Halen II is the second studio album by American rock band Van Halen. Released on March 23, 1979, it peaked at number six on the Billboard 200 and spawned the singles "Dance the Night Away" and "Beautiful Girls". As of 2004, it has sold almost six million copies in the United States. Critical reaction to the album has been positive as well, with The Rolling Stone Album Guide praising the "feel-good, party atmosphere" of the songs.

Background and recording
Recording of the album took place at Sunset Studio less than a year after the release of the band's 1978 debut album, Van Halen. Recording of the album began on December 10, 1978, just one week after completing their first world tour, and was complete within a week. The band used a Putnam 610 console to record the album, similar to the console Eddie would later install in his home studio in 1983. Many of the songs on Van Halen II are known to have existed prior to the release of the first album, and are present on the demos recorded in 1976 by Gene Simmons, and in 1977 by Ted Templeman, including an early version of "Beautiful Girls" (then known as "Bring On the Girls") and "Somebody Get Me a Doctor."

Artwork and packaging
The black-and-yellow guitar on the back of the album known as "Bumblebee" is buried with Pantera guitarist Dimebag Darrell, who was killed December 8, 2004. Eddie Van Halen placed it in his Kiss Kasket at his funeral because Darrell had said it was his favorite. Eddie himself stated in an interview conducted in December, 1979 by Jas Obrecht and published in the April, 1980 edition of Guitar Player Magazine, that the guitar itself was not actually used on the tracking of Van Halen II, as it had only been completed just in time for the photo shoots for the album.

However, the guitar was completed by Charvel, delivered to Eddie by Karl Sandoval in early October, 1978 and was photographed in use on the 2nd European leg of Van Halen's 1978 tour. Despite this, there is no conclusive evidence that the guitar itself was or was not used for the tracking of the album. It is likely that Eddie had, in fact, taken the guitar apart and reassembled it just in time for the photoshoot, as there is evidence of swapped parts and a new guitar strap made from a lap-style seatbelt seen in the photos from the shoot.

David Lee Roth is shown in a cast in the inner liner notes, as he allegedly broke his heel on the third try of the spread-eagle jump used on the back cover photo.

In the liner notes, The Sheraton Inn of Madison, Wisconsin is thanked. On Van Halen's first tour, they stayed at the hotel and destroyed the seventh floor, having fire extinguisher fights in the hallways and throwing televisions out windows. They blamed the incidents on their tour-mates at the time, Journey.

Critical reception

In a 1979 Rolling Stone review, Timothy White writes, "Scattered throughout Van Halen's second album are various Vanilla Fudge bumps and grinds, an Aerosmith-derived pseudobravado, a bit of Bad Company basement funk and even a few Humble Pie miniraveups," adding that the "LP retains a numbing live feel." In a retrospective review, Stephen Thomas Erlewine from AllMusic rates Van Halen II 4 stars out of 5. He notes the album is "virtually a carbon copy of their 1978 debut," though goes on to say it is "lighter and funnier" and "some of the grandest hard rock ever made." Erlewine praises Eddie's "phenomenal gift" and Roth's "knowing shuck and jive."

Commercial performance
It reached No. 6 on the Billboard 200 charts and #23 on the UK charts. Van Halen II was certified 5× Platinum in 2004. About 5.7 million records have been sold in the United States as of 2004. In 2000, Van Halen II was remastered and re-released.

Track listing

Personnel

Van Halen
David Lee Roth – lead vocals
Eddie Van Halen – guitar, backing vocals
Michael Anthony – bass guitar, backing vocals
Alex Van Halen – drums

Production
 Corey Bailey – engineering
Dave Bhang – artwork and design, art direction
Jim Fitzpatrick – engineer
Gregg Geller – remastering
Elliot Gilbert – photography
Donn Landee – engineer
Jo Motta – project coordinator
Ted Templeman – production
 Neil Zlozower – photography

Charts

Weekly charts

Year-end charts

Singles
Billboard (United States)

Certifications

References

Further reading

Album chart usages for Billboard200
1979 albums
Van Halen albums
Warner Records albums
Albums produced by Ted Templeman
Albums recorded at Sunset Sound Recorders